Gilmour Stuart "Gil" Boa (8 August 1924 – 7 September 1973) was a Canadian sport shooter who competed in the 1952 Summer Olympics, in the 1956 Summer Olympics, in the 1960 Summer Olympics, in the 1964 Summer Olympics, and in the 1972 Summer Olympics.

Boa attended Oakwood Collegiate Institute in Toronto.

References

1924 births
1973 deaths
Sportspeople from Montreal
Canadian male sport shooters
ISSF rifle shooters
Olympic shooters of Canada
Shooters at the 1952 Summer Olympics
Shooters at the 1956 Summer Olympics
Shooters at the 1960 Summer Olympics
Shooters at the 1964 Summer Olympics
Shooters at the 1972 Summer Olympics
Olympic bronze medalists for Canada
Olympic medalists in shooting
Medalists at the 1956 Summer Olympics
Shooters at the 1966 British Empire and Commonwealth Games
Commonwealth Games medallists in shooting
Commonwealth Games gold medallists for Canada
Pan American Games medalists in shooting
Pan American Games silver medalists for Canada
Pan American Games bronze medalists for Canada
Shooters at the 1967 Pan American Games
20th-century Canadian people
Medallists at the 1966 British Empire and Commonwealth Games